Invisible was an Argentine band formed by Luis Alberto Spinetta following the breakup of Pescado Rabioso in 1973 and the release of Artaud. The original lineup of the band was completed by Carlos "Machi" Rufino (bass, backing vocals) and Héctor "Pomo" Lorenzo (drums), both of whom conformed Pappo's Blues' rhythm section at the time. From 1976 until their breakup a year later, the band expanded into a quartet with the inclusion of guitarist Tomás Gubitsch.

History 

Invisible's first live performance took place at the Teatro Astral on 23 November 1973. The following year, they recorded their first single and their first album, self-titled Invisible. The group secluded more and more in their rehearsals and dropped live performances in small places; they only performed in big theaters or stadiums, but never in festivals.

After a long hiatus, they changed recording company (from Talent - Microfón to multinational CBS) and announced their second LP, Durazno Sangrando in 1975. The premiere took place in the Teatro Coliseo on 21 and 22 November that year. A cover version of "Amor de primavera," a song originally composed and performed by Tanguito, was Invisible's only sign of activity until the release of their third and last LP, El jardín de los presentes, in which the band incorporated Tomás Gubitsch on lead guitar. The album obtained massive success almost immediately and contains "El Anillo del Capitán Beto", considered a classic of Argentine rock. The album also featured a guest appearance by bandoneón virtuoso Rodolfo Mederos on "Las Golondrinas de Plaza de Mayo". The new material included in this LP would be first performed live on 6 August 1976 in the Estadio Luna Park. About "El Anillo del Capitán Beto," Spinetta once said: 

Invisible had its last concert on 12 December 1976 in the Luna Park. In early 1977, the group disbanded due to the different opinions among its members on which musical style to follow.

In the Spinetta y las Bandas Eternas concert of 2009 - a retrospective of Spinetta's career in which he brought together the bands that accompanied him over 40 years-Invisible played 5 songs: "Durazno sangrando", "Jugo de lúcuma", "Lo que nos ocupa es la conciencia, es la abuela que regula el mundo", "Niño condenado" and "Amor de primavera".

Discography

References

Argentine progressive rock groups
Musical groups from Buenos Aires